This is a list of sovereign states in the 2000s, giving an overview of states around the world during the period between 1 January 2000 and 31 December 2009. It contains 213 entries, arranged alphabetically, with information on the status and recognition of their sovereignty. It includes 194 widely recognized sovereign states, 2 associated states, and 17 entities which claim an effective sovereignty but are considered de facto dependencies of other powers by the general international community.

Members or observers of the United Nations

Non-UN members or observers

Other entities
Excluded from the list above are the following noteworthy entities which either were not fully sovereign or did not claim to be independent:
Antarctica as a whole had no government and no permanent population. Seven states claimed portions of Antarctica and five of these had reciprocally recognised one another's claims. These claims, which were regulated by the Antarctic Treaty System, were neither recognised nor disputed by any other signatory state.
  The European Union was a sui generis supranational organisation which had 15 (later 28) member states. The member states had transferred a measure of their legislative, executive, and judicial powers to the institutions of the EU, and as such the EU had some elements of sovereignty, without generally being considered a sovereign state. The European Union did not claim to be a sovereign state and had only limited capacity for relations with other states.
  Kosovo was a territory that was nominally part of Serbia and Montenegro (until 2006) and then Serbia (from 2006 to 2008), but was under United Nations administration as part of the United Nations Interim Administration Mission in Kosovo.
  The Sovereign Military Order of Malta was a United Nations observer. The order had bi-lateral diplomatic relations with a large number of states, but has no territory other than extraterritorial areas within Rome. The order's Constitution stated: "The Order is a subject of international law and exercises sovereign functions." Although the order frequently asserted its sovereignty, it did not claim to be a sovereign state. It lacked a defined territory. Since all its members were citizens of other states, almost all of them lived in their native countries, and those who resided in the order's extraterritorial properties in Rome did so only in connection with their official duties, the order lacked the characteristic of having a permanent population.
  The United Nations Transitional Administration in East Timor was a transitional non-independent territory governed by the United Nations. It was neither sovereign nor under the sovereignty of any other state. It became the independent state of East Timor on 20 May 2002.

See also
List of sovereign states by year
2000s (decade)
List of state leaders in 2000
List of state leaders in 2001
List of state leaders in 2002
List of state leaders in 2003
List of state leaders in 2004
List of state leaders in 2005
List of state leaders in 2006
List of state leaders in 2007
List of state leaders in 2008
List of state leaders in 2009

Notes

References

2000s politics-related lists
2000-2009